Cuerden Hall is a country mansion in the village of Cuerden near Preston, Lancashire, England. It is a Grade II* listed building. The Hall was formerly a family home between 1717 and 1906, and used by the Army until the 1960s. In 1985 it became a Sue Ryder neurological care centre. The Hall was sold to Manchester business man Colin Shenton in 2020 who is restoring it to its original purpose as a family home. The parkland and wider estate are known as Cuerden Valley Park.

History
The original house on the site, dating from the 17th century, no longer exists. The Charnock family of Charnock Richard, owned the estates until 1521, when Richard Charnock of Cuerden and Leyland sold his manor to Thomas Langton, Lord Newton. In 1605 Henry Banastre of Bank Hall bought the Cuerden Hall Estate from the Langton Family, (Barons of Newton-in-Makerfield). Henry's daughter Alice, wife of Sir Thomas Haggerston Bt, held ownership in 1641. The present building dates from 1717 and was erected by Banastre Parker, son of Robert Parker, the former High Sheriff of Lancashire for 1710, when he moved the Parker family from Extwistle Hall. Upon his death in 1738 the estate passed to his son Robert Parker (1727–1779) and in turn to his grandchildren Banastre Parker (1758–1788) and Thomas Towneley Parker (1760–1794). 

In the years 1816 to 1819 Robert Townley Parker (1793–1879), having inherited the estate from his father, remodelled the Hall according to the designs of Lewis Wyatt. This incorporated a significant extension to the east wing of the property.

After the death of Capt. Robert Townley Parker (1823–1894) and later his brother Thomas Towneley Parker (1822–1906) the estate passed to their nephew Reginald Arthur Tatton (1857–1926) who re-designed the gardens, introducing a pergola and gazebo, a walled garden and pond.

During the First World War Tatton adapted the Hall for use as an infirmary for troops, and between 1 May 1915 and 8 June 1917 it was known as Cuerden Hall Auxiliary Hospital. The drawing rooms, with the Tatton family’s collection of old masters and portraits still adorning the walls, were turned into wards and furnished with beds, bed linen and equipment, whilst the parkland and gardens provided an area for convalescence for the soldiers, enjoying such activities as boating on the lake, haymaking, and picnicking. There were also trips to the Tatton family’s other house nearby, Astley Hall. An album filled with photographs, letters and news cuttings that tell this particular story in Cuerden Hall's history was recently offered for sale.

During the Second World War, the estate was requisitioned by the Ministry of Defence and converted into an Army Education Centre and later became the British Army Divisional Headquarters (number four of five) of the Anti-Aircraft Command. By the late 1950s the Hall had been in use by the Army intermittently for a number of years and in 1958, after nearly 250 years of private family ownership, the Hall was finally sold by the Tatton family to the Ministry of Defence and, in 1967, it became the Army's Headquarters North West District.

In 1977 the Central Lancashire Development Corporation took over the Hall from the Ministry of Defence and established its own Headquarters there, in the process constructing new offices and car parks in the grounds. By 1978, the parkland and wider estate had been developed into Cuerden Valley Park. In 1985, the Hall became a Sue Ryder Care Home. In 2020 the Hall was sold and is being restored as a family home by Manchester business man Colin Shenton.

Gallery

See also
Listed buildings in Cuerden

References

External links
 Cuerden Valley Park - official site

Buildings and structures in the Borough of Chorley
Country houses in Lancashire
Grade II* listed buildings in Lancashire